Cyk or CYK may refer to:
CYK algorithm, a grammar-related algorithm
Cyk, Greater Poland Voivodeship (west-central Poland)
Cyk, Masovian Voivodeship (east-central Poland)
Çük, a Tatar holiday
CYK, the National Rail station code for Clydebank railway station, West Dunbartonshire, Scotland